Kentucky Route 296 (KY 296) is a  state highway in Whitley County, Kentucky that runs from KY 92 immediately west of the Williamsburg city line to U.S. Route 25W (US 25W) on the east side of Williamsburg via Williamsburg.

Major intersections

References

0296
Kentucky Route 296